Ad-Dahna Desert is the central division of the Arabian Desert. It is a corridor of sandy terrain forming a bow-like shape that connects an-Nafud desert in the north to Rub' al-Khali desert in the south. Its length is more than  siding Twaik Mountains from the east and does not exceed   in width. It is also considered the geographical margin separating Al-Ahsa Province from Najd. Al-Dahna Desert is therefore the string that connects the great deserts of Saudi Arabia.

The desert is a series of seven successive deserts, separated from one another by plains. Roads pass through Al-Dahnā, linking Kuwait with Al-Zilfī and Riyadh and connecting Riyadh with Hasa.

Al-Dahna desert is formed of high sand dunes spreading horizontally which are called veins, mostly red in color since it contains Iron Oxides.

Caves 
Beneath the harsh deserts of Saudi Arabia lie dark chambers and complex mazes filled with crystalline structures, stalactites and stalagmites. The limestone floor of the Summan plateau, a karst area to the east of the ad-Dahna desert, is riddled with such caves, known locally as Dahls. Some have tiny entrances which open into caves, others lead into a maze of passages which can be several kilometers long.  Local Bedouin have always known these caves and some were used as water supplies.  They were first systematically studied in the 1981, and later explored and reported by the Saudi Geological Survey.

See also 

 Rub' al Khali
 Arabian Desert
 Ancient towns in Saudi Arabia

References

External links 

Deserts of Saudi Arabia
Ergs
Najd